Erwin Junior Sánchez Paniagua (born 23 July 1993) is a professional footballer who plays as a midfielder for Bolivian Primera División side Blooming. Born in Portugal, he represents the Bolivia national team.

Club career
After becoming secondary school graduate, he decided to study a master's degree in International Business in the United States instead of practicing professional football. In 2015, after returning to Bolivia, he joined Real Potosí in the Bolivian Primera División.

International career
In November 2015, he received his first call-up to the Bolivia senior team for the 2018 FIFA World Cup qualifiers against Venezuela and Paraguay.

Personal life
He is the son of the former Bolivian international footballer Erwin "Platini" Sánchez. Born in Portugal when his father played for Boavista, he holds both Portuguese and Bolivian nationality.

References

External links

Erwin Junior Sánchez at playmakerstats.com (English version of ceroacero.es)

Living people
1992 births
Footballers from Lisbon
People with acquired Bolivian citizenship
Bolivian footballers
Bolivia international footballers
Portuguese footballers
Portuguese people of Bolivian descent
Bolivian expatriate footballers
Club Real Potosí players
R.D. Águeda players
Club Blooming players
Campeonato de Portugal (league) players
Association football midfielders
Bolivian Primera División players
2021 Copa América players